The 2nd Tony Awards were held on March 28, 1948, at the Waldorf-Astoria Grand Ballroom in New York City, and broadcast on radio station WOR and the Mutual Network. The Masters of Ceremonies were Harry Hershfield, Bert Lytell, and Hiram Sherman. The Antoinette Perry Awards for Excellence in Theatre, or more commonly, the Tony Awards, recognize achievement in live Broadway productions and performances, plus several non-competitive Special Awards (such as the Regional Theatre Award). They are presented by the American Theatre Wing and the League of American Theatres and Producers at an annual ceremony in New York City.

Ceremony
The award for the women was a gold bracelet, with a disc inscribed with the actress' initials and the name of the prize, and the men received a gold bill clip, similarly inscribed.

Performers and performances were: High Button Shoes (Nanette Fabray, Helen Gallagher, and Donald Saddler), Make Mine Manhattan (Kyle MacDonnell and Joshua Shelley), Look Ma I'm Dancin'! (Virginia Gorski and Don Liberto), Forest Bonshire, Jack Carter, Stan Fisher, Lisa Kirk, Kathryn Lee, Jack McCauley, Lucy Monroe, Ferruccio Tagliavini and Pia Tassinari (of the Metropolitan Opera), Maggie Teyte (City Center Opera).

Winners and nominees
Source:Tony Awards

Note: There were no pre-announced Tony nominees prior to 1956

Production

Performance

Craft

Special Awards

Multiple nominations and awards

The following productions received multiple awards.

3 wins: Mister Roberts
2 wins: Angel in the Wings, Command Decision and The Heiress

References

External links
Info please 1948 Tony Award winners

Tony Awards ceremonies
1948 in theatre
1948 awards
1948 in the United States
1948 in New York City
March 1948 events in the United States